Cecil Foster (born September 26, 1954) is a Canadian novelist, essayist, journalist, Public intellectual and scholar.  He is Chairman of the Department of Transnational Studies at the University of Buffalo.

Early life and education
Foster was born in Bridgetown, Barbados on 26 September 1954 to Fred and Doris Goddard. When Foster was two years old, his parents migrated to Britain, leaving their children with relatives. The family was extremely poor; Foster remembers a childhood where there was rarely enough to eat.

Foster attended Harrison College, a prestigious high school in Barbados. He immigrated to Canada in 1978. Foster completed his PhD at York University in 2002.

Career
Foster began working for the Caribbean News Agency in Bridgetown as the senior reporter and editor (1975–77), and the Barbados Advocate News as the reporter and columnist (1977–79), Foster emigrated to Canada in 1979. He went on to work for the Toronto Star as a reporter (1979–82).  Foster then began working for The Contrast as an editor (1979–82), Transportation Business Management as an editor (1982–83), The Globe and Mail as a reporter (1983–89), The Financial Post as a senior editor (1989), and also served as special adviser to Ontario's Ministry of Culture, through the mid-1990s. His most recent book, Where Race Does Not Matter (2004), explores the potential of multiculturalism in Canada.  It also expands on some of his earlier work that deals with issues of race in his own life as well as in the history of Canada. He is well known for exploring race through immigration, and empowers this culture and beliefs through "Blacks in Action". Foster continues to bring his own personal experiences, and real-life issues to the work that he continues to produce. Island Wings: A Memoir (1998) was written as an autobiography of his own life, and is often referred to as more informative, rather than entertainment. Foster completed his PhD, a phenomenological exploration of the concept of Blackness in Canada, at York University in 2003. His philosophical influences include Hegel, Marx, Alexandre Kojève, Will Kymlicka, Charles Taylor, and former Canadian Prime Minister Pierre Trudeau.

Foster taught sociology at the University of Guelph in Ontario, Canada.

He is a well-regarded novelist.  Foster served as a judge for the 2015 Scotiabank Giller Prize.
 
He won the Writers' Trust of Canada's Gordon Montador Award in 1997 for his book A Place Called Heaven for the Best Canadian Book on Contemporary Social Issues, the novel “Sleep On, Beloved” was shortlisted for the Ontario Trillium Book Prize, and “Blackness and Modernity: The Colour of Humanity and the Quest for Freedom” (McGill-Queen’s UP 2007), won the 2008 John Porter Tradition of Excellence Book Award by the Canadian Sociology Association.

In 2019 he published the non-fiction book They Called Me George: The Untold Story of Black Train Porters and the Birth of Modern Canada, a study of the history of Black Canadian train porters. Writer Suzette Mayr consulted the book as part of her research for her Giller Prize-winning 2022 novel The Sleeping Car Porter.

Books
No Man in the House - 1991 
Distorted mirror: Canada’s Racist Face - 1991  
Caribana, the Greatest Celebration - 1995 (about Caribana)
Sleep On, Beloved - 1995 
A Place Called Heaven: The Meaning of Being Black in Canada - 1996
Slammin' Tar - 1998
Island Wings: A Memoir - 1998
Dry Bones Memories - 2001
Where Race Does Not Matter: The New Spirit of Modernity - 2004
Blackness and Modernity: The Colour of Humanity and the Quest for Freedom - 2007
Genuine Multiculturalism: The Tragedy and Comedy of Diversity - 2013  
Independence - 2014 
They Called Me George: The Untold Story of Black Train Porters and the Birth of Modern Canada - 2019

See also 
 Barbadian Canadian

References

External links 
 Cecil Foster's Official Website

1954 births
Living people
Black Canadian writers
Canadian male novelists
Canadian sociologists
Writers from Ontario
People from Wellington County, Ontario
People from Bridgetown
Barbadian emigrants to Canada
University at Buffalo faculty
Canadian male non-fiction writers
20th-century Canadian novelists
20th-century Canadian non-fiction writers
20th-century Canadian male writers
21st-century Canadian novelists
21st-century Canadian non-fiction writers
21st-century Canadian male writers